Guldeford may refer to:

East Guldeford, East Sussex, England
Andrew de Guldeford, 14th century Lord Warden of the Cinque Ports, England
Guldeford baronets (1686–c. 1740), a title in the Baronetage of England

See also
Guildford (disambiguation)